The Ambassador of Australia to Thailand is an officer of the Australian Department of Foreign Affairs and Trade and the head of the Embassy of the Commonwealth of Australia to the Kingdom of Thailand. The ambassador resides in Bangkok. The current ambassador, since July 2022, is Angela Macdonald. A consulate-general in Phuket has assisted the work of the embassy since 14 June 2016.

List of heads of mission

Ambassadors

Consuls-General in Phuket

See also
Australia–Thailand relations
Foreign relations of Australia
Foreign relations of Thailand

References

External links
Australian Embassy, Thailand

 
Thailand
Australia